Kurbnesh is a village in the municipality of Mirditë, Lezhë County, Albania.

References 

Towns in Albania
Populated places in Mirditë